Esmé Kirby (born Esmé Cummings, 31 August 1910, Croydon, died 18 October 1999, Snowdonia), was a conservationist who together with her husband Peter Kirby formed the Snowdonia National Park Society, to ensure the mountains were protected from future development.   She was previously married to Thomas Firbank, whose bestseller "I Bought a Mountain" describes their life at the hill farm Dyffryn Mymbyr during the 1930s. Esme left the farm to the National Trust.

In 1997, Esmé initiated the eradication of grey squirrels (S. carolinensis) from the island of Anglesey, building a partnership of like minded individuals from within the local community. Today, the grey squirrel is absent from Anglesey and the island contains the largest red squirrel population in Wales.

References

Further reading 
 Esmé: The Guardian of Snowdonia by Teleri Bevan, Y Lolfa, 2014,

External links 
 The 3000 feet mountains of Wales
 Obituary:Esmé Kirby – Spirited conservationist immortalised by I Bought a Mountain, her husband's saga of Snowdonia by Jill Tunstall, The Guardian, 27 October 1999
 Obituary:Peter Kirby, The Telegraph, 14 Oct 2003
 The Snowdonia Society website

British conservationists
1910 births
1999 deaths
People from Croydon
Snowdonia